Flakstadøya is an island in the Lofoten archipelago in Nordland county, Norway.  The entire island lies within Flakstad Municipality with the Vestfjorden on the east side of the island and the Norwegian Sea on the west side of the island.

Geography
The island is connected to the neighboring island of Moskenesøya (to the south and west) by the Kåkern Bridge and Fredvang Bridges.  It is connected to the island of Vestvågøya (to the northeast) through the undersea Nappstraum Tunnel. The European route E10 highway crosses the island and connecting to the neighboring islands.

There are several villages on the island including the administrative centre of the municipality, Ramberg, and others such as Fredvang, Nusfjord, Sund, Vikten, and Napp.

Gallery

References

External links
 

Flakstad
Lofoten